Jeremy "J" Leman (born March 1, 1985) is a former American football linebacker.  He played college football at the University of Illinois, and was recognized as a consensus All-American.  He was signed by the Minnesota Vikings as an undrafted free agent in 2008, and has also been a member of the Oakland Raiders, Carolina Panthers, Philadelphia Eagles, and San Diego Chargers.  He is currently a football analyst for the Big Ten Network.

Early years

Leman was born and raised in Champaign, Illinois. He played high school football at Champaign Central High School where he played middle linebacker and tight end. During his senior year, he tallied 191 tackles and was named to the prestigious Illinois High School Football Coaches Association All-State Team.

College career
Leman attended the University of Illinois, where he played for the Illinois Fighting Illini football team from 2003 to 2007.  He redshirted as a true freshman in 2003.  Leman was a first-team All-Big Ten selection on defense in 2006 and 2007, and was recognized as a consensus first-team All-American in 2007.  He started over 40 games at linebacker during his college career.  During the 2007 campaign, Leman led the Illini to nine wins and helped the team earn a trip to the Rose Bowl.

Leman stands at sixth place on Illinois' all time tackle list.  His 152 tackles in the 2006 season ranked first in the Big Ten and is the sixth best single-season effort ever posted by an Illini gridder.  He also ranks fifth on the Illinois charts in career tackles for loss.

Statistics

Professional career

First stint with Vikings
After going undrafted in the 2008 NFL Draft, Leman signed with the Minnesota Vikings as an undrafted free agent. He was waived by team during final cuts on August 30.

Carolina Panthers
After spending the 2008 season out of football, Leman signed a future contract with the Carolina Panthers on January 13, 2009. He was waived by the team as a final cut on September 5.

Philadelphia Eagles
Leman was signed to the Philadelphia Eagles practice squad on September 7, 2009. He was released by the team on October 13.

San Diego Chargers
Leman was signed to the San Diego Chargers practice squad on November 3, 2009. He was released by the team on December 1.

Second stint with Vikings
Leman was re-signed to the Minnesota Vikings practice squad on December 9, 2009, and was promoted to the active roster on December 15, after linebacker Erin Henderson was suspended for four games.

He was released by the team with an injury settlement on October 19, 2010.

Florida Tuskers
Leman was signed by the Florida Tuskers of the United Football League on November 1, 2010.

Second stint with San Diego Chargers
Leman was signed to the San Diego Chargers practice squad on November 30, 2010. He was waived by the team on August 30, 2011.

Oakland Raiders
The Oakland Raiders claimed Leman off of waivers on August 31.

Oakland then cut Leman on September 3, 2011 when they announced their 53-man roster for the 2011 season.  However, the following day, the Raiders named Leman to their 8-man practice squad for the 2011 season.  He was cut from the practice squad on 12/6/11.

Personal life
Leman graduated from the University of Illinois with a speech communication degree and a master's degree in Human Resource Education.

External links
Just Sports Stats
Carolina Panthers bio 
Illinois Fighting Illini bio
Oakland Raiders bio 
San Diego Chargers bio

1985 births
Living people
Sportspeople from Champaign, Illinois
Players of American football from Illinois
All-American college football players
American football linebackers
Illinois Fighting Illini football players
Minnesota Vikings players
Carolina Panthers players
Philadelphia Eagles players
San Diego Chargers players
Florida Tuskers players
Oakland Raiders players
College football announcers